Onopordum, or cottonthistle, is a genus of plants in the tribe Cardueae within the family Asteraceae. They are native to southern Europe, northern Africa, the Canary Islands, the Caucasus, and southwest and central Asia. They grow on disturbed land, roadsides, arable land and pastures.

They are biennials (rarely short-lived perennials) with branched, spinose winged stems, growing 0.5–3 m tall. In the first season they form a basal rosette of gray-green felted leaves and rarely a few flower heads. In the second season they grow rapidly to their final height, flowering extensively, and then die off after seed maturation.

The leaves are dentate or shallowly lobed to compound with several pinnatifid or deeply cut leaflets, and strongly spiny. The terminal flower head is typical for thistles, a semi-spherical to ovoid capitulum with purple (seldom white or pink) disc florets. There are no ray florets. The receptacle is glabrous with dentate margins. The tube of the corolla is slender, sac-shaped and symmetrical. The anthers have awl-shaped outgrowths on the top. The capitula have several overlapping rows of leathery basal simple linear-lanceolate spines. These are smooth to slightly pubescent.

These plants propagate only by seed. The seed heads mature in mid-summer, releasing their seeds. The fruit is a glabrous achene, 4–6 mm long and with 4-50 ribs. The pappus consists of many rows of simple, fine to minutely rough hairs, united in a circular base.

Onopordum species are used as food plants by the larvae of some Lepidoptera species including Coleophora onopordiella (feeds exclusively on O. acanthium).

In the Greek island of Crete a native species called agriagginara (αγριαγγινάρα) or koufoti (κουφωτοί) has its heads (flowers) and tender leaves eaten raw by the locals.

 Species
 Onopordum acanthium L. - Cotton thistle, Scotch thistle, Scotch common-thistle, heraldic thistle, woolly thistle  - widespread across Europe and temperate Asia
 Onopordum acaulon  L. - Stemless thistle, horse thistle - France, Spain, Algeria, Morocco, Tunisia
 Onopordum alexandrinum Boiss. - Egypt, Palestine, Lebanon, Syria, Israel, Jordan
 Onopordum algeriense (Munby) Pomel - Algeria
 Onopordum ambiguum Fresen. - Egypt, Palestine, Lebanon, Syria, Israel, Jordan
 Onopordum anatolicum (Boiss.) Eig. - Turkey
 Onopordum arenarium M.Hossain & M.A.A.Al-Sarraf - Algeria, Morocco, Tunisia, Libya
 Onopordum armenum Grossh. - Caucasus, Iran, Turkey
 Onopordum blancheanum (Eig) Danin - Israel, Palestine, Jordan, Syria, Lebanon
 Onopordum boissierianum Raab-Straube & Greuter - Turkey
 Onopordum bracteatum Boiss. & Heldr. - Greece, Turkey, Cyprus
 Onopordum canum Eig - Iran, Jordan, Israel, Turkey
 Onopordum carduchorum Bornm. & Beauverd - Lebanon, Syria, Turkey, Iran
 Onopordum carduelium Bolle - Canary Islands
 Onopordum carduiforme Boiss.  - Egypt, Palestine, Lebanon, Syria, Israel, Jordan
 Onopordum carmanicum (Bornm.) Bornm. - Iran
 Onopordum caulescens d'Urv. - Greece
 Onopordum cinereum Grossh. - Caucasus, Turkey, Iran, Turkmenistan, Afghanistan
 Onopordum corymbosum Willk. - France, Spain
 Onopordum cynarocephalum Boiss. & Blanche - Palestine, Lebanon, Syria, Israel, Jordan
 Onopordum cyrenaicum Maire & Weiller - Libya
 Onopordum dissectum Murb. - Spain, Morocco
 Onopordum dyris Maire - Morocco
 Onopordum elongatum Lam.
 Onopordum eriocephalum Rouy - France
 Onopordum espinae Coss.
 Onopordum heteracanthum C.A.Mey. - Caucasus, Lebanon, Turkey, Syria, Palestine, Iran, Afghanistan, Saudi Arabia
 Onopordum horridum Viv. - Italy
 Onopordum illyricum L. - Illyrian thistle, Illyrian cottonthistle - Mediterranean
 Onopordum leptolepis DC. - from Palestine to Altay + Xinjiang
 Onopordum macracanthum Schousb. - Spain, Portugal, Italy, Morocco, Algeria
 Onopordum macrocanthum d'Urv.
 Onopordum macrocephalum Eig - Palestine, Lebanon, Syria, Israel, Jordan
 Onopordum mesatlanticum Emb. & Maire - Morocco
 Onopordum micropterum Pau - Spain, Canary Islands
 Onopordum minor L. - Iran
 Onopordum myriacanthum Boiss. - Greece, Turkey, Bulgaria
 Onopordum nervosum Boiss. - Moor's cottonthistle - Spain, Portugal
 Onopordum parnassicum Boiss. & Heldr. - Greece, Turkey
 Onopordum platylepis (Coss. ex Murb.) Murb. - Libya, Tunisia
 Onopordum polycephalum Boiss. - Turkey
 Onopordum prjachinii Tamamsch. - Uzbekistan, Kyrgyzstan, Tajikistan
 Onopordum seravschanicum Tamamsch. - Uzbekistan, Kyrgyzstan, Tajikistan
 Onopordum sibthorpianum Boiss. & Heldr. - Greece, Sicily, Malta, Turkey, North Macedonia, Saudi Arabia
 Onopordum tauricum Willd. - Turkish thistle, Taurian thistle, Taurus cottonthistle, bull cottonthistle - southern + central Europe, Ukraine, Middle East
 Onopordum turcicum Danin  - Turkey
 Onopordum wallianum Maire - Morocco

 Natural hybrids
 Onopordum × brevicaule (Onopordum acaulon × Onopordum acanthium )
 Onopordum × erectum (Onopordum nervosum ssp. castellanum × Onopordum tauricum ssp. corymbosum )
 Onopordum × macronervosum (Onopordum nervosum × Onopordum macrocanthum)
 Onopordum × onubense (Onopordum dissectum × Onopordum macrocanthum)
 Onopordum × spinosissimum (Onopordum illyricum × Onopordum acanthium)

Invasive problems
Some species of Onopordum have been introduced as ornamental plants in the temperate regions of North America and Australia, where they have become naturalised in the wild. In most of these countries, these thistles are considered noxious weeds, especially in Australia where a biological control program has been set up (using the Rosette Crown Weevil, Trichosirocalus briesei). In North America, there are also Trichosirocalus control programs, but they have proved detrimental to native thistles.

References

 Briese, D.T., Lane, D., Hyde-Wyatt, B.H., Crocker, J., Diver, R.G. (1990). Distribution of thistles of the genus Onopordum in Australia. Plant Protection Quarterly 5: 23-27.

 
Asteraceae genera